Alfredo Di Stéfano was an Argentinian-born professional footballer who played for both Argentina and Spain between 1947 and 1961, and scored 29 international goals during that time. He played as a deep-lying forward, and is considered one of the best players of all time. Di Stéfano was one of the first footballers to control matches by roaming the pitch, unusual in an era when most players did not stray from their set position. He was twice awarded the Ballon d'Or as European football's player of the year; in 1957 and 1959.

Di Stéfano made his international debut for Argentina in December 1947, scoring a goal during a 7–0 win against Bolivia. He scored six goals, including his first international hat-trick—against Colombia—during his six appearances for Argentina. These all came during the 1947 South American Championship, which Argentina won. In 1949, he was one of many Argentinian players who left the country to play in an unsanctioned Colombian league which paid higher wages than those available in his native country. During his time there, he appeared four times for Colombia in matches that are not recognised by FIFA. He moved to Real Madrid in 1953, and gained Spanish citizenship three years later.

He debuted for Spain in January 1957, scoring a hat-trick in a friendly against the Netherlands. Generally, he was less successful internationally than with Real Madrid; The Guardians Brian Glanville suggested that he was unable to dictate play within the defensive structure established by Spain's manager Helenio Herrera. Nevertheless, he scored 23 goals in 31 matches for his adopted country, becoming Spain's leading goal-scorer, which he remained until Emilio Butragueño surpassed his total in 1990.

Di Stéfano scored more goals against Chile than any other team, doing so five times: once for Argentina and four times for Spain. He was most prolific at the Estadio George Capwell and Santiago Bernabéu stadiums, scoring six goals at each. Of Di Stéfano's 29 goals, 16 were scored in friendlies. In competitive matches, he scored six times in the South American Championship, four times in FIFA World Cup qualification matches, and three times in his two UEFA European Championship qualification matches.

International goals
Di Stefano's team's score listed first, score column indicates score after each Di Stefano goal.

Statistics

Notes

References

Di Stefano
Argentina national football team records and statistics
Spain national football team records and statistics